The 2008 IAAF World Indoor Championships in Athletics were held at the Luis Puig Palace in Valencia, Spain, March 7–9, 2008.

Bid
Valencia was announced the winning bidder by the IAAF on November 13, 2005 at an IAAF Council meeting in Moscow, Russia.

Results

Men
2004 | 2006 | 2008 | 2010 | 2012

Women
2004 | 2006 | 2008 | 2010 | 2012

Medal table

Participating nations

 (2)
 (1)
 (2)
 (1)
 (1)
 (9)
 (2)
 (1)
 (7)
 (4)
 (9)
 (4)
 (1)
 (1)
 (1)
 (3)
 (13)
 (1)
 (1)
 (6)
 (1)
 (1)
 (1)
 (8)
 (1)
 (1)
 (11)
 (2)
 (1)
 (1)
 (2)
 (1)
 (1)
 (1)
 (11)
 (1)
 (13)
 (2)
 (1)
 (4)
 (1)
 (1)
 (3)
 (6)
 (1)
 (1)
 (2)
 (12)
 (1)
 (1)
 (16)
 (2)
 (28)
 (5)
 (2)
 (1)
 (1)
 (2)
 (1)
 (1)
 (1)
 (1)
 (1)
 (1)
 (2)
 (1)
 (13)
 (13)
 (5)
 (1)
 (5)
 (7)
 (1)
 (2)
 (1)
 (1)
 (3)
 (1)
 (5)
 (1)
 (3)
 (1)
 (1)
 (1)
 (1)
 (1)
 (1)
 (2)
 (1)
 (5)
 (1)
 (1)
 (8)
 (1)
 (1)
 (1)
 (1)
 (3)
 (3)
 (6)
 (1)
 (1)
 (1)
 (1)
 (15)
 (7)
 (2)
 (4)
 (13)
 (47)
 (1)
 (1)
 (1)
 (1)
 (1)
 (2)
 (2)
 (1)
 (2)
 (1)
 (1)
 (2)
 (4)
 (5)
 (1)
 (3)
 (23)
 (2)
 (10)
 (1)
 (1)
 (1)
 (1)
 (1)
 (1)
 (4)
 (1)
 (1)
 (16)
 (1)
 (49)
 (2)
 (1)
 (2)
 (1)
 (1)
 (1)

References

External links

Official website of 2008 IAAF World Indoor Championships 

 
World Indoor Championships
Ath
World Athletics Indoor Championships
Sports competitions in Valencia
International athletics competitions hosted by Spain
21st century in Valencia
March 2008 sports events in Europe